The Kadalundi Bird Sanctuary lies in Vallikunnu Grama Panchayat of Malappuram district in Kerala, India. It spreads over a cluster of islands where the Kadalundipuzha River flows into the Arabian Sea. The Sanctuary hill is around 200 m above sea level. It is located 19 km away from the Kozhikode city centre.

Fauna
Over a hundred species of native birds have been recorded in the sanctuary, including about 60 species of migratory birds which visit seasonally; these include terns, gulls, herons, sandpipers and cormorants.  Notable species are whimbrels and brahminy kites.  The sanctuary is well known for a wide variety of fish, mussels and crabs. Some species of snakes, cobras, vipers and kraits also live here.

See also 
 Vallikkunnu
 Malappuram district
 Eranad
 Parappanangadi
 Chaliyar river
 Kadalundi river

Image gallery

References

External links

 From Kerala Tourism Department site
 Kadalundi Bird Sanctuary
 Kadalundi Bird Sanctuary

Bird sanctuaries of Kerala
Tourist attractions in Malappuram district
Geography of Malappuram district
Protected areas with year of establishment missing